In Sri Lanka, the driving licence is the official document which authorises its holder to operate various types of motor vehicle on public roads. They are administered by the Department of Motor Traffic (DMT). A licence is required to drive on a public road and a minimum age is 18 years for all vehicles.

Candidates have to pass a theory and practical test to obtain driving licence along with a medical clearance.
New Smart Card driving licences are available from 2012. These cards are intended for the use in the proposed "point system".

Classes of driving licence 
The following classes are printed on the new high security driving licence:

References

External links
 Department of Motor Traffic
 Driving Exam App

Sri Lanka 
Road transport in Sri Lanka